Plast is a 1995 Just D studio album.

Track listing
Sköna skor
87-87
Din boss
Hubbabubba
Vi vinner - ni stinker
Bogeymannen
Tre gringos
Inte kul att va ful
D man inte vet
Tvångstankar
Plast

Charts

Certifications

References 

1995 albums
Just D albums
Swedish-language albums